Kuroshima or Kuro Island  may refer to various Japanese islands:
Kuroshima, Ehime (uninhabited) 
Kuroshima, Kagoshima, part of Mishima village
Kuroshima, Tokashiki, Okinawa, in Tokashiki
Kuroshima, Taketomi, Okinawa, one of the Yaeyama Islands, in the town of Taketomi

People with the surname 
Yuina Kuroshima (born 1997), Japanese model and actress
Denji Kuroshima (1898–1943), Japanese author
Kameto Kuroshima (1893-1965), Imperial Japanese Navy Admiral

See also 
 Kurushima (disambiguation)

Japanese-language surnames